Dog Falls (Gaelic: Eas a' Choin) is a series of waterfalls on the River Affric, in Glen Affric in the Highlands of Scotland. The falls are within the Glen Affric National Nature Reserve, managed by Forestry and Land Scotland. There are several way-marked paths to the falls.

See also
Waterfalls of Scotland

References

Waterfalls of Highland (council area)